Granger Township is one of the seventeen townships of Medina County, Ohio, United States.  The 2000 census found 3,928 people in the township.

Geography
Located in the east part of the county, it borders the following townships:
Hinckley Township - north
Richfield Township, Summit County - northeast corner
Bath Township, Summit County - east
Copley Township, Summit County - southeast corner
Sharon Township - south
Montville Township - southwest corner
Medina Township - west
Brunswick Hills Township - northwest corner

No municipalities are located in Granger Township.

Name and history
Granger Township was organized in 1820, and named for Gideon Granger, a member of the Connecticut House of Representatives and 4th United States Postmaster General. The name was selected per a popular vote. It is the only Granger Township statewide.

Government
The township is governed by a three-member board of trustees, who are elected in November of odd-numbered years to a four-year term beginning on the following January 1. Two are elected in the year after the presidential election and one is elected in the year before it. There is also an elected township fiscal officer, who serves a four-year term beginning on April 1 of the year after the election, which is held in November of the year before the presidential election. Vacancies in the fiscal officership or on the board of trustees are filled by the remaining trustees.

References

External links
Township website
County website

Townships in Medina County, Ohio
Townships in Ohio